Fred Tobias Fulton, nicknamed "The Rochester Plasterer", (April 19, 1891 – July 7, 1973) was an American heavyweight professional boxer.

Biography
He was born in Blue Rapids, Kansas on April 19, 1891.

Fulton made his professional debut in 1913 and did not retire from boxing until 1933.  Fulton began his boxing career in the early twentieth century.  His final record was 83 wins (72 by KO), 17 losses and 4 draws.  In 2003 he was named to Ring magazine's' list of 100 greatest punchers of all time.

Fulton, although possessing a strong punch, had a checkered career against the other fighters of the era, and never landed a title fight.  He did defeat Gunboat Smith, considered the best of the heavyweight contenders, on two occasions; by TKO on November 27, 1917, and by 2-round KO on April 7, 1920. He also defeated Carl Morris by disqualification on September 3, 1917, by 4-round KO on November 22, 1921 and by 4-round TKO on December 18, 1922; and Fireman Jim Flynn by 2-round KO March 17, 1916. Fulton was defeated by Carl Morris,  by disqualification on April 3, 1914 and April 4, 1917, Al Palzer by 4-round KO on May 22, 1914; and Arthur Pelkey by 5-round KO on October 28, 1915.

Fulton's dreams of obtaining a title fight were dashed when he was KO'd by Jack Dempsey in 18.6 seconds of the first round on July 27, 1918, and by Harry Wills in 3 rounds on July 26, 1920.

At the time of his retirement Fulton had compiled a professional record of 84–19–4, with 70 wins coming by knockout.

He died in Park Rapids, Minnesota on July 7, 1973.

Notes

External links
Fulton's Record at Cyber Boxing Zone

1891 births
1973 deaths
Heavyweight boxers
Boxers from Minnesota
American male boxers
People from Marshall County, Minnesota
People from Park Rapids, Minnesota